Bit-Istar was an Assyrian town and a local kingdom (c. 12th century BC -  c. 710 BC) at western Zagros that according to inscriptions of Tiglath Pileser III and Sargon II. It was located close to the source of a river to the east of Dyala.

Stronach and Calmeyer proposed Ravansar as a possible candidate for the place of Bit-Istar.  Recent surveys by Y. Hassanzadeh led to discovery of new evidence indicating presence of rich 1st-millennium remains close to the spring of Ravansar.

The ruler of this town during reign of Sargon II was Burburazu who brought his tributes to Sargon during his campaign to the region in 714 BC. A column base at the edge of Ravansar spring could belong to a temple that was built for Ishtar near "Water hole".

Tang-i Var, famous Assyrian inscription from reign of Sargon II is located about 30 km to north of Ravansar.

References

 Hassanzadeh, Y.,  M. Karami, F. Bahrol’oloomi, K. Taheri, A. Tahmasbi, A.  Moradi Bisetouni and F. Biglari (2010) Khanileh: "New evidence of Chalcolithic and Early Historic occupations from northwest of the Kermanshah Plain, Central Zagros", Iranian Journal of Archaeology and History.
 Parpola, S. & M. Porter (2001)
The Helsinki Atlas of the Near East in the Neo-Assyrian Period, Edited by: Simo Parpola & Michael Porter, The Casco Bay Assyriological Institute The Neo-Assyrian Text Corpus Project, Finland.
 Radner, K., (2003) "A Median Sanctuary at Bit-Ištar". In G.B. Lanfranchi, M. Roaf & R. Rollinger (ed.), Continuity of Empire: Assyria, Media, Persia. History of the Ancient Near East Monographs 5 (Padova 2003) 119-130.

Former populated places in Iran
Archaeological sites in Iran
Iron Age Asia
Buildings and structures in Kermanshah Province
History of Kermanshah Province